Sydney Football Club is an Australian association football club based in Moore Park, Sydney. The club was formed in 2004. Sydney became the first out of three clubs based in New South Wales admitted into the A-League in 2005.

The list of encompasses the honours won by Sydney FC at national and regional level, records set by the club, their managers and their players. The player records section itemises the club's leading goalscorers and those who have made the most appearances in first-team competitions. It also records notable achievements by Sydney FC players on the international stage.

Sydney FC have won 11 top-flight titles, including four A-League Men Premierships, five A-League Men Championships, one Australia Cup and one Oceania Club Championship. The club's record appearances maker is Rhyan Grant, who currently has 299 appearances since his debut in 2008. Alex Brosque is Sydney FC's record goalscorer, scoring 83 goals in total.

All figures are correct as of 25 February 2023.

Honours and achievements

Domestic
 A-League Men Premiership (regular season)
Winners (4) – Record: 2009–10, 2016–17, 2017–18, 2019–20
Runners-up (4): 2005–06, 2014–15, 2018–19, 2020–21

 A-League Men Championship (finals)
Winners (5) – Record: 2006, 2010, 2017, 2019, 2020
Runners-up (2): 2015, 2021

 Australia Cup
Winners (1): 2017
Runners-up (2): 2016, 2018

Continental
 OFC Champions League
Winners (1): 2005

Other
 Townsville Football Cup
Winners (1): 2014

Individual
 Johnny Warren Medal: Milos Ninkovic (2016–17 & 2020–21), Adrian Mierzejewski (2017–18)
 Joe Marston Medal: Dwight Yorke (2006), Simon Colosimo (2010), Milos Ninkovic (2019), Rhyan Grant (2020)
 Mark Viduka Medal: Adrian Mierzejewski (2017)
 Golden Boot: Marc Janko (2014–15), Bobô (2017–18)
 Goalkeeper of the Year: Danny Vukovic (2016–17), Andrew Redmayne (2019–20 & 2020–21)
 Coach of the Year: Graham Arnold (2016–17 & 2017–18)

Player records

Appearances

 Most A-League Men appearances: Rhyan Grant, 254
 Most national cup appearances: Alex Brosque, 27
 Most continental appearances: Rhyan Grant, 27
 Youngest first-team player: Nikolas Tsattalios, 16 years, 171 days (against Newcastle Jets, A-League Pre-Season Challenge Cup, 19 August 2006)
 Oldest first-team player: Alessandro Del Piero, 39 years, 160 days (against Melbourne Victory, A-League, 18 April 2014)
 Most consecutive appearances: Andrew Redmayne, 78 (from 2 August 2017 to 19 May 2019)

Most appearances
Competitive matches only, includes appearances as substitute. Numbers in brackets indicate goals scored.

a. Includes the A-League Pre-Season Challenge Cup and Australia Cup
b. Includes the Oceania Club Championship and AFC Champions League
c. Includes goals and appearances (including those as a substitute) in the FIFA Club World Cup, Pan-Pacific Championship and 2005 Australian Club World Championship Qualifying Tournament.

Goalscorers

 Most goals in a season: Bobô, 36 (in the 2017–18)
 Most league goals in a season: Bobô, 27 in the A-League, 2017–18)
 Youngest goalscorer: Chris Payne, 17 years, 308 days (against Queensland Roar, A-League Pre-Season Challenge Cup, 19 August 2006)
 Oldest goalscorer: Alessandro Del Piero, 39 years, 148 days (against Wellington Phoenix, A-League, 6 April 2014)

Top goalscorers
Competitive matches only. Numbers in brackets indicate appearances.

a. Includes the A-League Pre-Season Challenge Cup and Australia Cup
b. Includes the Oceania Club Championship and AFC Champions League
c. Includes goals and appearances (including those as a substitute) in the FIFA Club World Cup, Pan-Pacific Championship and 2005 Australian Club World Championship Qualifying Tournament.

International

This section refers only to caps won while a Sydney FC player.

 First capped player: David Zdrilic, for Australia against Indonesia on 29 March 2005
 Most capped player: Dwight Yorke with 17 caps.
 Most capped player for Australia: Rhyan Grant with 12 caps.
 First player to play in the Asian Cup finals: Rhyan Grant, for Australia against Jordan, 6 January 2019

Transfers

Record transfer fees received
Where the report mentions an initial fee potentially rising to a higher figure depending on contractual clauses being satisfied in the future, only the initial fee is listed in the tables.

Managerial records

 First full-time manager: Pierre Littbarski managed Sydney FC from February 2005 to May 2006
 Longest-serving manager: Steve Corica —  (1 July 2018 to present)
 Shortest tenure as manager: Anthony Crea — 1 day (22 October 2007 to 23 October 2007)
 Highest win percentage: Pierre Littbarski, 60.53%
 Lowest win percentage: Branko Čulina, 25.00%

Club records

Matches
 First match: Sydney FC 6–1 Manly United, friendly, 25 March 2005
 First A-League Men match: Sydney FC 1–1 Melbourne Victory, 28 August 2005
 First national cup match: Sydney FC 3–1 New Zealand Knights, A-League Pre-Season Challenge Cup group stage, 23 July 2005
 First continental match: Sydney FC 3–2 Auckland City, Oceania Club Championship group stage, 31 May 2005

Record wins
 Record A-League Men win: 
 7–1 against Wellington Phoenix, 19 January 2013
 6–0 against Perth Glory, 30 December 2017
 Record national cup win: 8–0 against Darwin Rovers, Round of 32, 2 August 2017
 Record continental win: 9–2 against Sobou, Oceania Club Championship group stage, 2 June 2005
 Record Asian win: 5–0 against Kaya–Iloilo, AFC Champions League preliminary round, 8 March 2022

Record defeats
 Record A-League Men defeat:
 0–5 against Melbourne Victory, 16 October 2005
 2–7 against Central Coast Mariners, 3 November 2012
 Record national cup defeat:
 0–3 against Wellington Phoenix, A-League Pre-Season Challenge Cup group stage, 22 July 2006
 0–3 against Central Coast Mariners, A-League Pre-Season Challenge Cup group stage, 29 July 2007
 0–3 against Central Coast Mariners, A-League Pre-Season Challenge Cup group stage, 27 July 2008
 Record continental defeat: 
 0–4 against Kawasaki Frontale, AFC Champions League group stage, 21 May 2019
 0–4 against Yokohama F. Marinos, AFC Champions League group stage, 19 February 2020

Record consecutive results
 Record consecutive wins: 10
 from 7 May 2005 to 30 July 2005
 from 10 August 2016 to 13 November 2016
 Record consecutive defeats: 6, from 22 April 2022 to 10 May 2022
 Record consecutive matches without a defeat: 18, from 24 February 2017 to 3 November 2017
 Record consecutive matches without a win: 10, from 7 August 2010 to 16 October 2010
 Record consecutive matches without conceding a goal: 8, from 10 August 2016 to 29 October 2016
 Record consecututive matches without scoring a goal: 5
 from 9 May 2007 to 29 July 2007
 from 4 December 2010 to 29 December 2010

Goals
 Most league goals scored in a season: 64 in 27 matches, A-League, 2017–18
 Fewest league goals scored in a season: 28 in 21 matches, A-League, 2007–08
 Most league goals conceded in a season: 51 in 27 matches, A-League, 2012–13
 Fewest league goals conceded in a season: 19 in 21 matches, A-League, 2006–07

Points
 Most points in a season: 66 in 27 matches, A-League, 2016–17
 Fewest points in a season: 26 in 21 matches, A-League, 2008–09

Attendances
 Highest attendance at Sydney Football Stadium: 41,689, against Central Coast Mariners, A-League Grand Final, 18 October 2014
 Lowest attendance in Sydney Football Stadium: 3,424 against Perth Glory, A-League Pre-Season Challenge Cup semi-final, 3,424
 Highest attendance at Jubilee: 19,081 against Melbourne Victory, A-League, 25 November 2018
 Lowest attendance at Jubilee: 435 against Kaya–Iloilo, AFC Champions League group stage, 8 March 2022

See also
 List of Sydney FC seasons

References

External links

Australian soccer club statistics
Records and statistics
Sydney-sport-related lists